Wat That Khao ("Temple of the White Reliquary") is a ruined temple in the Wiang Kum Kam archaeological site, south of Chiang Mai in northern Thailand, thought to have been built in the 16th or 17th century. Its chedi is presumed to have been formerly lime-plastered, hence the name. The temple faces northeast.

History
Excavation started in 1985. A vihara was found in front of the chedi, and at its rear an altar and a wall. South of the vihara a building considered to have perhaps been a rites pavilion was discovered, behind which parts of a lime-coated, brick Buddha image were discovered. Also discovered were 16th century writings in the Fak Kham script, and Haripunchai-style Buddha amulets dating to the 15th century that are assumed to have been brought to the site at a later date. Excavation was halted due to a land ownership dispute, and restoration of the structures was completed in 1986.

See also
Wiang Kum Kam

References

 Oliver Hargreave: Exploring Chiang Mai, City, Valley & Mountains. Within Books, 4th Edition, 2013. 

That Khao
17th century in Chiang Mai